Ramón Orlando Valoy García (born July 29, 1959), is a Dominican musician, singer, arranger, composer, record producer and songwriter, besides being a gran maestro pianist in Caribbean rhythms. Ramón Orlando received seven Casandra awards in the 1992 ceremony, including the Soberano, which is the most important category in the Dominican awards ceremony.  In 2005, he was nominated for the Latin Grammy Award in the Best Merengue Album category.

Career 

Ramón Orlando Valoy was born on July 29, 1959 in Manoguayabo, Santo Domingo, Dominican Republic. He is the son of Cuco Valoy'.'''

Ramón Orlando started his music career at age 14, as a singer, piano player, arranger, composer and songwriter in his father's merengue band called La Tribu. He formed his own merengue music band in 1984 called "Los Virtuosos", later renamed “Cuco Valoy y Orquesta” with Peter Cruz y Henry García as lead singers.

Years later, the Cuco Valoy group broke up and Ramón moved to Colombia to physically separate himself from the Dominican Republic due to his political differences with the Dominican president Joaquín Balaguer. Ramón Orlando then undertook a more ambitious musical project. He and then-famous merengue singers Peter Cruz and Henry García formed La Orquesta Internacional (The International Orchestra), in which Ramón Orlando intended to be the composer and musical director, while Cruz and García were intended to be the vocalists. However, of the first ten "single" songs to be recorded (and released individually), Ramón chose to sing four of them himself, which caused a split in the group. Peter Cruz and Henry García then each formed a short-lived group. Upon the two vocalists' departure, Ramón Orlando quickly hired some vocalists with voices sounding similar to those of Cruz and García in order to perform songs already gaining airplay.

Ramón Orlando is also the composer of the theme El venao, which found a large audience in several Latin American countries including Colombia, Venezuela and Puerto Rico.
Ramón Orlando shares with Juan Luis Guerra the greatest Soberano Award in 1992. He was a nominee in the Latin Grammy Awards of 2005 for the Best Merengue Album (Generaciones) in the tropical category.

Ramón Orlando serves as a pastor in a Protestant church.

Discography

Awards

Ramón Orlando received in 1992 the highest award given by Soberano Awards; that year he received 7 awards, for which Ramón Orlando holds the record of receiving the most Soberano Awards in a ceremony. In 2005, he was nominated to the 6th Annual Latin Grammy Awards as Best Merengue Album with Generaciones''.

Arrangements
Ramon Orlando is a prolific arranger of latin music including merengue, salsa, bachata and ballads. During his ongoing career, he has completed more than 2,000 arrangements for his band, for Los Virtuosos, La Tribu, Los Cantantes, Cuco Valoy, and for other artists including Alberto Beltrán, Fernando Villalona, Alex Bueno, Milly Quezada, Rubby Pérez, Wilfrido Vargas, Luys Bien, Miriam Cruz, Manny Manuel, among others.

The following are some of well-known or recent arrangements by Ramón Orlando:

See also
 List of songs written by Ramón Orlando

References

External links
[ All Music]

1959 births
Dominican Republic musicians
Living people
People from Santo Domingo Province